Events from the year 1376 in Ireland.

Incumbent
Lord: Edward III

Events

Births
James Butler, 3rd Earl of Ormonde (1376–1405)

Deaths